Robert Mark Taylor (born 22 February 1966 in Walsall), known as Mark Taylor, is an English former professional footballer who played as a midfielder in the Football League for Walsall, Sheffield Wednesday and Shrewsbury Town, and in non-league football for clubs including Hereford United, Nuneaton Borough, Halesowen Town, Redditch United, Bromsgrove Rovers and Rugby Town.

References

External links
 
 Season-by-season stats (to 2004) at The Independent Hereford United Online Archive

1966 births
Living people
Sportspeople from Walsall
English footballers
Association football midfielders
Walsall F.C. players
Sheffield Wednesday F.C. players
Shrewsbury Town F.C. players
Hereford United F.C. players
Nuneaton Borough F.C. players
Halesowen Town F.C. players
Redditch United F.C. players
Bromsgrove Rovers F.C. players
Rugby Town F.C. players
English Football League players
National League (English football) players
Southern Football League players